SIES College of Management Studies (SIESCOMS) is a South Indian Education Society (SIES) campus located in Nerul, a node of Navi Mumbai. SIESCOMS was established in 1995 with the primary objective of providing quality management education and managing company.

History 
SIESCOMS was promoted by SIES in 1995. It is the prime constituent of its academic complex at Nerul. Over a period of time, SIESCOMS has been catering to the needs of various segments of management education aspirants.

Academics
SIESCOMS's main programmes are a two-year full-time course in Masters in Management Studies (Mumbai University) and Post Graduate Diploma in Management (PGDM- autonomous) . The Post Graduate Diploma in Management program and the other PGDM-Biotechnology and Pharmaceutical Managements comes under the SIES Business school whereas the Masters of management studies, a Mumbai university affiliated course is a part of SIESCOMS. SIESCOMS also has full-time Master in Computer Application (MCA), which is a two-year programme from year 2020, aiming at creating managers specially for IT sector. The college also offers a doctoral program in collaboration with Bengal Engineering and Science University, Shibpur (BESUS), Kolkata. Other special programs include a two-year program on Biotechnology Business Management, and a one-year program on Social Enterprise Management targeted at the NGO sector, from new centre at Sion.

Rankings

SIESCOMS was ranked 88 among management schools in India by Outlook Indias "Top 150 Private MBA Institutions".

SIESCOMS was ranked 21 among B-Schools in India by The Times of India "Best B-School Survey 2021".

References

External links
 The Official Website of SIESCOMS

Business schools in Mumbai
Affiliates of the University of Mumbai